The N367 is a provincial road in the province of Groningen in the Netherlands. It runs from Winschoten in the municipality of Oldambt to Nieuwe Pekela in the municipality of Pekela.

Route description 
It starts in Winschoten in the municipality of Oldambt. It then runs south via Blijham in the municipality of Westerwolde, goes through Oude Pekela, and ends in Nieuwe Pekela in the municipality of Pekela.

Junction and exit list

References 

367
Transport in Oldambt (municipality)
Pekela
Westerwolde (municipality)